Henrietta Hume Pettijohn Buck (September 30, 1854-October 11, 1921) was New Mexico’s first female lawyer.

She was born September 30,  1854 in Columbia, Missouri as the eldest child to James Robert Hume and Sally Boothe. Buck attended the University of Missouri and initially began a career as a novelist when she wrote Etalee, From the Waves, After Many Years, and Dorothy.

On April 15, 1892, Buck became the first woman admitted to practice law in New Mexico.

She married Dr J.B. Pettijohn from Las Vegas, New Mexico and divorced him in 1893. They had one daughter, Cora Hume Pettijohn. She then married ranch owner Arthur P. Buck. Their daughter Carrick Hume Buck also became a prominent lawyer, and her distinguished career included becoming the first woman to serve as the Assistant U.S. District Attorney and a judge (including a Supreme Court Justice) in Hawaii.

Buck died on October 11, 1921 in Los Angeles, California. She was buried in her birthplace of Columbia.

The New Mexico Women's Bar Association established the Henrietta Pettijohn Award in her name.

See also 

 List of first women lawyers and judges in New Mexico
 List of first women lawyers and judges in Hawaii

References 

New Mexico lawyers
19th-century American women lawyers
1853 births
1921 deaths
19th-century American lawyers